The House of Walderdorff is the name of an old and distinguished German noble family, whose members occupied many important ecclesiastical positions within the Holy Roman Empire.

History 
First mentioned in 1198, the Walderdorff family belongs to the Uradel of the Rhineland and has strong historic ties to the Catholic Church. Members of the family originally held the rank of Imperial Knight, and were later elevated to baronial rank on 1 September 1663 and to comital rank on 12 August 1754 by Francis I, Holy Roman Emperor. Since 1657 the family's seat has been Molsberg Castle in Westerwaldkreis.

Notable family members 
 Wilderich von Walderdorff (1617–1680), Prince-Bishop of Vienna
 Johann IX Philipp von Walderdorff (1701–1768), Archbishop-Elector of Trier and Prince-Bishop of Worms
 Wilderich of Walderdorf (1739–1810), Prince-Bishop of Speyer
 Rudolf Graf Walderdorff (d.1866), Austrian malacologist and entomologist
 Tessa Gräfin von Walderdorff (b.1994), American socialite

References 

German noble families
Walderdorff family